Neomordellistena rufopygidialis is a beetle in the genus Neomordellistena of the family Mordellidae. It was described in 1950 by Píc.

References

rufopygidialis
Beetles described in 1950